Student housing at University of Florida is governed by the Division of Student Affairs, and provides housing for undergraduate, graduate, and professional students on and off-campus.

Approximately 8,100 students live in single-student residence halls. Nearly 1,600 students and their families also live on campus in 980 apartments arranged in Village Communities.

Undergraduate Housing

East Campus Residence Halls

West Campus Residence Halls

Honors Housing 

The University of Florida Honors Program offers housing for freshmen at Hume Hall. This residentially-based academic community consists of two residence halls and integrates the housing needs of Honors residents with facilities, staff, and programs in support of the Honors Program.

In total 608 residents can be accommodated, and Hume Hall is located in the heart of the UF campus. The facility has a commons building, a number of multimedia-capable classrooms, faculty offices with an on-site academic advisers, a large activity room, and an information desk.

Graduate and family housing 
The graduate and family housing complexes are: Corry Village, Diamond Village, Maguire Village, Tanglewood Village, and University Village South. In addition they may reside in the UF affiliate The Continuum.

Dependent children residing in the student housing with their parents are assigned to schools in the Alachua County Public Schools. As of 2015, residents of Diamond Village, Maguire Village, Tanglewood Village, and University Village South are assigned to Idylwild Elementary School. Corry Village and The Continuum are in the zone for Finley Elementary School. Kanapaha Middle School and Gainesville High School are the assigned secondary schools for all of the properties except for Tanglewood Village, which is instead assigned to Lincoln Middle School and Eastside High School.

Village Apartments 

Corry Memorial Village (1958)
 Corry Village
 Units:
 1 bedrooms — 100
 2 bedrooms — 108
 3 bedrooms — 8
Emory Gardner Diamond Memorial Village (1965)
 Diamond Village
 Units:
 1 bedrooms — 104
 2 bedrooms — 104
Raymer Francis Maguire Memorial Village (1971)
 Maguire Village
 Units:
 1 bedrooms — 110
 2 bedrooms — 110
University Village South (1972)
 Units:
 1 bedrooms — 64
 2 bedrooms — 64
Tanglewood Village (1973)
 Units:
 1 bedrooms — 89
 2 bedrooms — 81
 2 bedroom townhouses — 30
 Efficiencies — 8

Former facilities

There have been some buildings at the University of Florida that were used for housing, but have since been demolished or converted to other uses.

After rapid increases in enrollment after World War II and the allowing of women to enroll, several temporary buildings were erected on the campus. These included
 Flavets (1945–1974) - Named after a contraction of the term "Florida Veterans," these former military housing units were located at three locations on campus, including Flavet I near the current site of the J. Wayne Reitz Union, Flavet II at the current location of Beaty Towers, and Flavet III at the current location of the Keys Residential Complex.
 Temporary Frame Residence Halls (1946-1960s) - One story frame buildings built in several locations on campus, including the current site of the O'Connell Center and the current Computer Science and Engineering building.
 Grove Hall (1946–1977) - Reconstructed military building relocated from Camp Blanding located on the current site of the Architecture and Fine Arts colleges

Other facilities built after World War II included:
 The King’s House (1954–1967) - Two white framed buildings on University Avenue originally built in 1921 and used for experimental housing arrangements. The King's House was an unofficial name for Building 880, the eastern building. The buildings later housed the Institute of Black Culture and the Institute of Hispanic Culture before being demolished in 2017.
 Lonilair & Michael Halls, Pierce & Patrick Courts - Leased off-campus housing for women, located north of University Avenue near Anderson Hall and Library West
 Trailervet Village, Alachua Army Air Base, and Stengel Air Field - Temporary housing consisting of trailers and military barracks was located at the Alachua Army Air Base (now Gainesville Regional Airport) and Stengel Air Field (now Butler Plaza)
 Yon Hall (1966–1995) - Athlete housing located in the east side of the Ben Hill Griffin Stadium. When the NCAA ruled against athletic housing, the Springs Residential Complex was constructed and the facilities at the stadium were converted into offices for several university departments.
 Schucht Village (1959–1997) - Apartment buildings constructed for veterans and their families, and later graduate students and their families. The facility was located near Shands, and the complex was sold to Shands in 1997. Shands subsequently demolished all of the buildings except for Building 271, which was refurbished and is now used to house transplant patients.
 Hume Hall (1958–2000) - "Old Hume" was large multi-story residence hall located at the intersection of Gale Lemerand Drive (formerly North South Drive) and Museum Road. The building was demolished in 2000 to construct the current Honors Residential College at Hume Hall.

See also 
 University of Florida Campus Historic District

References

External links 
 Official UF Housing Website
 UF Housing Statistics
 Past Residences
 College Board Statistics

Florida, University of
University of Florida
Florida, University of, student housing
1906 establishments in Florida